Baldwin Village is a neighborhood in  the South Los Angeles region of Los Angeles County, California.

Geography

In 1988, Baldwin Village became be a distinct community in the city's General Plan, and signs were to be posted to identify the area. It is bounded by La Brea Avenue, Marlton Avenue, Obama Blvd, Martin Luther King Jr. Boulevard and Santo Thomas Drive.

History
Baldwin Village was developed in the early 1940s and 1950s by architect Clarence Stein, as an apartment complex for young families. Baldwin Village is occasionally called "The Jungles" by locals because of the tropical trees and foliage (such as palms, banana trees and begonias)  that once thrived among the area's tropical-style postwar apartment buildings. The Los Angeles City Council changed the name in 1990, after residents complained that it reinforced the neighborhood's image as a wild and menacing place. They renamed it Baldwin Village after the Baldwin Hills neighborhood.

Development
While redevelopment has shown many successes, not all efforts have yielded results.

Marlton Square
Development of Marlton Square was stalled in bankruptcy after years of work and millions of dollars of public and private funds until 2012.

Kaiser Permanente
The neighborhood houses a 100,000 square foot Kaiser Permanente medical office building and  outdoor plaza which opened  on September 7, 2017.

Education

 Hillcrest Drive Elementary - 4041 Hillcrest Dr, Los Angeles, CA 90008

Media

Film
Baldwin Village served as a location for the 1992 film White Men Can't Jump.  The neighborhood also appears in the 2001 film Training Day.

Television
It was also in episode 1 of Season 3 of the NBC television series Southland.

It was a prominent setting in the S.W.A.T. episode "Local Heroes" (Season 4, Episode 15).

Music Videos
Wacka Flocka Flame's "Hard in Da Paint" music video.

See also
Baldwin Hills
Crenshaw District
Baldwin Hills Mountain Range

References

External links
 Kaiser Permanente Baldwin Hills
LA Improvements.
The Gangs of Los Angeles - Part 3: Helping to Heal Communities, FBI

Neighborhoods in Los Angeles
Crenshaw, Los Angeles
South Los Angeles